Naveen Perwani (born 23 October 1971) is a Pakistani amateur snooker player. Perwani reached the quarter-final at the 2006 IBSF World Championships in Amman, Jordan, where he was eliminated by Atthasit Mahitthi 6–5.

He is the cousin of fashion designer Deepak Perwani. He represented Pakistan in Asian Games held in December 2006 at Doha, Qatar.

Achievements 

2006 IBSF World Snooker Championship (quarter-finals)

2002 Asian Games – Snooker Doubles – Bronze Medal

2013 21st Sindh Snooker Cup title winner.

References

Living people
1971 births
Pakistani snooker players
Pakistani Hindus
Sindhi people
Asian Games medalists in cue sports
Cue sports players at the 2006 Asian Games
Cue sports players at the 2002 Asian Games

Asian Games bronze medalists for Pakistan
Medalists at the 2002 Asian Games
Place of birth missing (living people)